Pahad Itzhak Synagogue, also known as the Kraim Synagogue, is a synagogue in the Abbassia neighbourhood of Cairo, Egypt. It was built in 1925; the name Kraim refers to the synagogue's gabbai, Zaki Kraim, who oversaw its remodeling between 1925 and 1932.

References

External links 

 Video tour of Pahad Yitzhak Synagogue, Cairo by Diarna

Synagogues in Cairo